= Susan McDade =

Canadian economist and energy expert

Susan McDade is a Canadian economist and energy expert. She is currently the Assistant Administrator and Director of the Bureau for Management Services at the United Nations Development Programme.

== United Nations assignments ==
Ms. McDade previously served as Deputy Assistant Administrator and Deputy Director for UNDP's Regional Bureau for Latin America and the Caribbean. Prior to this, she served as Director of Country Actions with the UN Secretary-General's Sustainable Energy for All (SE4All) initiative from July 2013, United Nations Resident Coordinator and UNDP Resident Representative, UNFPA Representative and UN Designated Officials in Uruguay (2010-2013) and in Cuba (2006-2010). She was the Manager of the Sustainable Energy Programme for UNDP's Bureau for Development Policy (2000-2006) in New York, positioning the organization as a global leader on energy and sustainable development issues.

Ms. McDade started her career with UNDP in 1991 as a Junior Professional Officer with the Regional Bureau for Latin America and the Caribbean in Guatemala. She was Assistant Resident Representative in China (1992-1996) and subsequently became a Technical Specialist on energy, for the Bureau for Programme and Policy Support in New York (1996-1999). Before joining UNDP, she worked as a Visiting Lecturer and Research and Teaching Assistant with the Institute of Social Studies in Netherlands.

She holds an MA from the ISS in Development Studies specializing in Economic Policy and Planning and a BA in Economics and International Development from the University of Guelph in Canada. In 1999 Ms. McDade was a visiting fellow at the Kennedy School of Government, Harvard University. She was a guest lecturer on the topics of energy and development at Columbia, Rice and Princeton Universities.

== Personal life ==
She self describes as single while saying she has been a mother for 20 years on her Facebook profile.
